"Velvet" is the debut and potential winner's single by American singer and season seven third place finalist of The Voice, Chris Jamison. The song was released digitally by Republic Records on December 15, 2014. The song was written by Elof Loelv, Alex Lacasse and Kellen Pomeranz.

Background and release
For the first time in the show history, the top four finalists from the seventh season of The Voice were given the opportunity to debut their potential winner's singles on the show. Jamison worked with his coach on the show, Adam Levine, and picked the song "Velvet" that was written by Loelv, Lacasse and Pomeranz. Jamison performed and debuted the song on December 15, 2014, during the seventh-season finale performance show of The Voice. The song was released on iTunes for digital download after the show.

Critical reception
The song peaked at number three on the US iTunes chart, becoming Jamison's highest charting single in the United States to date. It was also charted on Billboard Hot 100 for number 53.

Music video
The music video premiered on December 15, 2014.

Live performances
"Velvet" was first performed by Jamison on the seventh-season finale performance show of The Voice on December 15, 2014.

Format and track listing
 Digital download
 "Velvet" – 3:56

Charts

Release history

References

2014 singles
2014 songs
Republic Records singles
Pop ballads
Songs written by Alex Lacasse
Songs written by Elof Loelv